York County is a historic county in Upper Canada, Canada West, and the Canadian province of Ontario. It was organized by the Upper Canada administration from the lands of the Toronto Purchase and others.

Created in 1792, at its largest size, it encompassed the area that presently comprises the City of Toronto, the regional municipalities of Halton, Peel, and York as well as portions of Regional Municipality of Durham and the City of Hamilton. However by 1851, York County only consisted of the areas presently comprising Toronto and Regional Municipality of York. In 1953, York County was split again, with the area south of Steeles Avenue forming the Municipality of Metropolitan Toronto. 

York County was formally dissolved in 1971, with its remaining municipalities reorganized as the Regional Municipality of York.

History
York County was created on 16 June 1792 and was part of the jurisdiction of the Home District of Upper Canada. It originally comprised all of what is now the City of Toronto, the regional municipalities of Halton, Peel, and York as well as portions of the Regional Municipality of Durham, and the City of Hamilton. The town of York, later incorporated as the City of Toronto in 1834, served as the initial seat for the county. Once Toronto was incorporated, it was severed from York County, although county offices remained located in Toronto.

In 1816, Wentworth and Halton counties were created, with portions of York County transferred to the new counties. In 1851, the western portions of York County were separated to form Peel County. In the same year, the eastern riding of York County was separated from York to form Ontario County.

In April 1953, the Metropolitan Toronto Act was passed in the Legislative Assembly of Ontario. This saw municipalities south of Steeles Avenue severed from York County and forming the Municipality of Metropolitan Toronto. As a result of this separation, the county offices for York County were moved from Toronto to Newmarket. The Act went into effect on 1 January 1954.

At a meeting in Richmond Hill on 6 May 1970, officials representing the municipalities of York County approved plans for the creation of a regional government entity to replace York County. In 1971, the remaining portion of York County was dissolved by restructuring it into the new Regional Municipality of York.

Historic municipalities
The following table is a list of historic municipalities that were at one point situated within York County.

Governance
The seat of government for York County was situated in Toronto (named York prior to 1834) from 1792 to 1953. After the creation of Metropolitan Toronto in 1953, the seat of government for York County was moved to Newmarket.

County offices
From the 19th century to 1900, the offices of York County were held in various court houses. York County offices were first held at the First York County Courthouse on Front Street and Parliament Street from 1800 to 1813. The First York County Courthouse also housed the Legislative Assembly of Upper Canada.)After the Battle of York, the county officials and legislative assembly met at the home of Major Alexander Montgomery Jr., located on north side of Richmond Street between Yonge and Victoria Streets (now Confederation Life Building). From 1824 to 1845, the county's offices were located at the Second York County Courthouse on Church Street and King Street. From 1852 to 1900, the county offices were located at the Adelaide Court House. 

From 1900 to 1953, the municipal government of Toronto shared its office space with York County at Toronto's Old City Hall. 

After the southern portion of York County was severed to form Metropolitan Toronto in 1953, the county's offices were relocated to the Old Newmarket Town Hall and Courthouse. In 1957, the York County Administrative Offices was also opened at 62 Bayview Parkway.

Representation in colonial legislatures

Upper Canada
York County was represented in the Legislative Assembly of Upper Canada by several ridings, initially grouped with neighbouring counties, then for the town of York (York, Upper Canada) and rural parts or York County:

Province of Canada
York was represented in the Legislative Assembly of the Province of Canada from 1841 to 1867 with rural and town (city after 1834) ridings:

Most members were residents in Toronto and did not necessary represent a specific geographical area of York County.

See also
 Greater Toronto Area
 List of Ontario census divisions

Notes

References

Populated places established in 1792
Populated places disestablished in 1971
1971 disestablishments
Former counties in Ontario
Regional Municipality of York